23718 Horgos, provisional designation , is a stony background asteroid from the central regions of the asteroid belt, approximately 2.9 kilometers in diameter. It was discovered on 2 April 1998, by Hungarian astronomers Krisztián Sárneczky and László Kiss at Konkoly's Piszkéstető Station northeast of Budapest, Hungary. The asteroid was named after the Serbian town of Horgoš.

Orbit and classification 

Horgos is a non-family from the main belt's background population. It orbits the Sun in the central main belt at a distance of 2.1–3.1 AU once every 4 years and 1 month (1,501 days). Its orbit has an eccentricity of 0.19 and an inclination of 1° with respect to the ecliptic.

The body's observation arc begins with a precovery taken by Spacewatch at Kitt Peak Observatory in November 1995, or 29 months prior to its official discovery observation at Piszkéstető.

Physical characteristics 

Horgos has been characterized as a stony S-type asteroid by PanSTARRS photometric survey.

Rotation period 

In January 2014, a rotational lightcurve of Horgos was obtained from photometric observations in the R-band by astronomers at the Palomar Transient Factory in California. Lightcurve analysis gave a rotation period of 3.57 hours with a brightness amplitude of 0.21 magnitude.

Diameter and albedo 

According to the survey carried out by the NEOWISE mission of NASA's Wide-field Infrared Survey Explorer, Horgos measures 2.944 kilometers in diameter and its surface has an albedo of 0.269. The Collaborative Asteroid Lightcurve Link assumes a standard albedo for stony asteroids of 0.20 and calculates a diameter of 2.79 kilometers based on an absolute magnitude of 15.14.

Naming 

This minor planet was named after the village of Horgoš, now in northern Serbia. The village is located near the Hungarian border and has a large Hungarian population. It is also the place where the second discoverer László L. Kiss grew up. The official naming citation was published by the Minor Planet Center on 5 July 2001.

References

External links 
 Asteroid Lightcurve Database (LCDB), query form (info )
 Dictionary of Minor Planet Names, Google books
 Asteroids and comets rotation curves, CdR – Observatoire de Genève, Raoul Behrend
 Discovery Circumstances: Numbered Minor Planets (20001)-(25000) – Minor Planet Center
 
 

023718
Discoveries by Krisztián Sárneczky
Discoveries by László L. Kiss
Named minor planets
19980402